Vistalite is an album by drummer Roy Haynes which was recorded in 1977 and released on the Galaxy label.

Reception 

The AllMusic review by Scott Yanow  called it "an interesting but sometimes uncomfortable mixture of advanced hard bop with electric instruments, aspects of funk, and the influence in spots of the avant-garde" and stated "None of the group originals are all that memorable either, making this date a slight disappointment".

Track listing 
 "Vistalite" (Roy Haynes) – 5:55
 "More Pain Than Purpose" (Stanley Cowell) – 5:42
 "Wonderin'" (Cecil McBee) – 4:06
 "Venus Eyes" (John Stubbledfield) – 4:39
 "Rok Out" (Marcus Fiorillo) – 6:32
 "Water Children" (Kenneth Nash) – 6:42
 "Invitation" (Bronisław Kaper, Paul Francis Webster) – 6:02

Personnel 
 Roy Haynes – drums
 Ricardo Strobert – alto saxophone, flute (tracks 1, 2, 4 & 5)
 Joe Henderson – tenor saxophone (tracks 1, 2, 5 & 7) 
 Stanley Cowell (tracks 1-4 & 7), George Cables (tracks 3 & 6) – piano, electric piano 
 Milcho Leviev – electric piano (track 6) 
 Marcus Fiorillo – guitar (tracks 1–6)
 Cecil McBee – bass (tracks 3 & 6) 
 Dave Jackson – electric bass (tracks 1, 2, 4, 5 & 7)
 Kenneth Nash – percussion, tambourine (tracks 1 & 3–6)

References 

Galaxy Records albums
Roy Haynes albums
1979 albums